The 2020 Richmond Kickers season was the club's 28th season of existence, their 16th season in the third tier of American soccer, and their second season in the newly created USL League One. It is the Kickers' second season playing in the third tier of American soccer since 2016, when they were in the United Soccer League. Initially, the preseason began on February 8, 2020 and was scheduled to conclude on March 24, 2020. The regular season was originally scheduled to begin on March 28, 2020 and conclude on September 24, 2020.

On March 13, 2020, it was announced that the regular season would be delayed for at least two weeks due to the COVID-19 pandemic. The regular season was slated to begin on March 28, 2020 but was delayed to April 11, 2020, before being indefinitely postponed. The season began with a truncated 16-match season (instead of 28) beginning on July 25, 2020 and concluded on October 24, 2020 (a month later than originally planned).

The 2020 season saw the club return to a winning record for the first time since 2016. Additionally, the club's 4th-place finish was the Kickers' best regular season performance since 2014. Despite the record, the club on the final day of the season failed to reach the USL Championship Game after losing at home to Chattanooga. Striker, Emiliano Terzaghi, scored 10 goals during the season, which was the best performance by a striker for the Kickers since Yudai Imura in 2016. Terzaghi had a 0.63 goals per game average, which was the best performance by a striker for Richmond since Robert Ssejjemba in 2006.

Roster

.

Non-competitive

Preseason exhibitions

Midseason exhibitions

Competitive

USL League One

Standings

Results by matchday

Match results
USL League One released their full schedule for the 2020 season on December 20, 2019, creating the following fixture list for the early part of Richmond's 2020 season. As a result of the COVID-19 pandemic, a modified 16-game schedule was released on July 10 with the first three games. The full schedule was released on July 17.

Notes

U.S. Open Cup 

As a USL League One club, Richmond was to enter the competition in the Second Round. Their fixture was initially scheduled to begin on April 7, but was postponed due to the COVID-19 pandemic. On August 17, 2020 the competition was cancelled.

Bon Secours Cup 
The Bon Secours Cup is a two-legged regular season series between USL League One's two southeastern clubs: the Richmond Kickers and the Greenville Triumph. The team with the best aggregate record wins the series. The aggregate score was 4–4 after two matches, but the Kickers won 2–1 on away goals.

Statistics

Appearances and goals

Numbers after plus–sign (+) denote appearances as a substitute.

Top scorers
{| class="wikitable" style="font-size: 95%; text-align: center;"
|-
!width=30|Rank
!width=30|Position
!width=30|Number
!width=175|Name
!width=75|
!width=75|
!width=75|Total
|-
|rowspan="1"|1
| FW
| 32
|align="left"|  Emiliano Terzaghi
| 10
| 0
|10
|-
|rowspan="4"|2
| FW
| 15
|align="left"|  Oalex Anderson
| 2
| 0
|2
|-
| MF
| 17
|align="left"|  Jonathan Bolanos
| 2
| 0
|2
|-
| MF
| 98
|align="left"|  Ryley Kraft
| 2
| 0
|2
|-
| DF
| 4
|align="left"|  Ivan Magalhães
| 2
| 0
|2
|-
|rowspan="4"|3
| MF
| 7
|align="left"|  Matt Bolduc
| 1
| 0
|1
|-
| FW
| 9
|align="left"|  Stanley Alves
| 1
| 0
|1
|-
| FW
| 10
|align="left"|  Mutaya Mwape
| 1
| 0
|1
|-
| MF
| 23
|align="left"|  Victor Falck
| 1
| 0
|1
|-

Top assists
{| class="wikitable" style="font-size: 95%; text-align: center;"
|-
!width=30|Rank
!width=30|Position
!width=30|Number
!width=175|Name
!width=75|
!width=75|
!width=75|Total
|-
| 1
| MF
| 98
|align="left"|  Ryley Kraft
| 4
| 0
|4
|-
|-
|rowspan="2"|2
| DF
| 3
|align="left"|  Ian Antley
| 3
| 0
|3
|-
| MF
| 7
|align="left"|  Matt Bolduc
| 3
| 0
|3
|-
|rowspan="6"|4
| DF
| 3
|align="left"| Scott Thomsen
| 1
| 0
| 1
|-
| FW
| 10
|align="left"|  Mutaya Mwape
| 1
| 0
|1
|-
| MF
| 17
|align="left"|  Jonathan Bolanos
| 1
| 0
|1
|-
| DF
| 18
|align="left"|  Wahab Ackwei
| 1
| 0
|1
|-
| MF
| 21
|align=left|  Greg Boehme
| 1
| 0
|1
|-
| MF
| 31
|align=left|  Mumbi Kwesele
| 1
| 0
|1
|-

Disciplinary record
{| class="wikitable" style="text-align:center;"
|-
| rowspan="2" !width=15|
| rowspan="2" !width=15|
| rowspan="2" !width=120|Player
| colspan="3"|USL1
| colspan="3"|U.S. Open Cup
| colspan="3"|Total
|-
!width=34; background:#fe9;|
!width=34; background:#fe9;|
!width=34; background:#ff8888;|
!width=34; background:#fe9;|
!width=34; background:#fe9;|
!width=34; background:#ff8888;|
!width=34; background:#fe9;|
!width=34; background:#fe9;|
!width=34; background:#ff8888;|
|-
|| 2 || DF ||align=left|  Ian Antley
|| 1 || 1 || 0 || 0 || 0 || 0 || 1 || 1 || 0
|-
|| 3 || DF ||align=left|  Scott Thomsen
|| 1 || 0 || 0 || 0 || 0 || 0 || 1 || 0 || 0
|-
|| 4 || DF ||align=left|  Ivan Magalhães
|| 2 || 0 || 0 || 0 || 0 || 0 || 2 || 0 || 0
|-
|| 7 || MF ||align=left|  Matt Bolduc
|| 3 || 0 || 0 || 0 || 0 || 0 || 3 || 0 || 0
|-
|| 10 || FW ||align=left|  Mutaya Mwape
|| 2 || 0 || 0 || 0 || 0 || 0 || 2 || 0 || 0
|-
|| 11 || MF ||align=left|  David Diosa
|| 1 || 0 || 0 || 0 || 0 || 0 || 1 || 0 || 0
|-
|| 12 || DF ||align=left|  Kyle Venter
|| 1 || 0 || 0 || 0 || 0 || 0 || 1 || 0 || 0
|-
|| 14 || MF ||align=left|  Luke Pavone
|| 2 || 0 || 0 || 0 || 0 || 0 || 2 || 0 || 0
|-
|| 17 || MF ||align=left|  Jonathan Bolanos
|| 1 || 0 || 0 || 0 || 0 || 0 || 1 || 0 || 0
|-
|| 18 || DF ||align=left|  Wahab Ackwei
|| 3 || 0 || 0 || 0 || 0 || 0 || 3 || 0 || 0
|-
|| 21 || MF ||align=left|  Greg Boehme
|| 1 || 0 || 0 || 0 || 0 || 0 || 1 || 0 || 0
|-
|| 23 || DF ||align=left|  Victor Falck
|| 1 || 0 || 0 || 0 || 0 || 0 || 1 || 0 || 0
|-
|| 31 || MF ||align=left|  Mumbi Kwesele
|| 1 || 0 || 0 || 0 || 0 || 0 || 1 || 0 || 0
|-
|| 32 || FW ||align=left|  Emiliano Terzaghi
|| 1 || 0 || 0 || 0 || 0 || 0 || 1 || 0 || 0
|-
|| 77 || MF ||align=left|  Charles Boateng
|| 1 || 0 || 0 || 0 || 0 || 0 || 1 || 0 || 0
|-
|| 93 || MF ||align=left|  Gianluca Cuomo
|| 1 || 0 || 0 || 0 || 0 || 0 || 1 || 0 || 0
|-
|| 98 || MF ||align=left|  Ryley Kraft
|| 1 || 0 || 0 || 0 || 0 || 0 || 1 || 0 || 0
|-
!colspan="3"|Total !! 24 !! 1 !! 0 !! 0 !! 0 !! 0 !! 24 !! 1 !! 0

Transfers

In

Out

Loan in

Loan out

Awards

USL League One Player of the Month

USL League One Goal of the Month

USL League One Player of the Week

USL League One Goal of the Week

USL League One Team of the Week

References

Richmond Kickers seasons
Richmond Kickers
Richmond Kickers
Richmond Kickers
Kickers